The Cabinet of Morocco is the chief executive body of the Kingdom of Morocco.

The Cabinet is usually composed of some 25 ministers and 5 to 10 "Secretaries of State" and "Minister Delegates". It is headed by the Prime Minister (officially Head of the Government since August 2011), who is appointed by the King of Morocco from the party that achieved a plurality in the parliamentary elections. The Cabinet's ministers are chosen by the PM, after consultation with other parties forming the Government coalition, then validated and appointed by the King. As of September 10, 2021, the current government is headed by Aziz Akhannouch, who was appointed by King Mohammad VI to form a new government after leading the results of the 2021 general election. On 7 October 2021, the new cabinet of 24 ministers, which included 7 women, was sworn in.

Cabinet of Aziz Akhannouch, 2021–present

The formation of the current government resulted in changes to certain ministries, with some functions being renamed, split or merged with others.

Source:

Historical Cabinets

Cabinet of Saad-Eddine El Othmani, 2017–2021

Source:

Cabinet of Abdelilah Benkirane II, October 2013–2016

Cabinet of Abdelilah Benkirane I, 2012–October 2013

Abbas el-Fassi, 2007–2012

Driss Jettou, 2002–2007

Abderrahmane el-Youssoufi II, 2000–2002

Abderrahmane el-Youssoufi I, 1998–2000

Abdellatif Filali III, 1997–1998

Abdellatif Filali II, 1995–1997

Abdellatif Filali I, 1994–1995

See also
Politics of Morocco

References

External links
Official Portal of the Government
History of Morocco governments

Government of Morocco
Morocco, Cabinet